Jere Innala (born 17 March 1998) is a Finnish professional ice hockey player for Frölunda HC in the Swedish Hockey League (SHL) and the Finnish national team.

Playing career
On 7 May 2022, Innala left the Finnish Liiga after six seasons between HPK and HIFK to join Swedish club, Frölunda HC of the SHL, on a two-year contract.

International play

Innala represented Finland at the 2021 and 2022 IIHF World Championship.

Career statistics

Regular season and playoffs

International

References

External links

1998 births
Living people
Finnish ice hockey left wingers
Frölunda HC players
HIFK (ice hockey) players
HPK players
Lempäälän Kisa players
People from Hämeenlinna
Sportspeople from Kanta-Häme